Río Grande District may refer to:

 Río Grande District, Condesuyos, Peru
 Río Grande District, Palpa, Peru